Olga Marlin is the author of To Africa with a Dream and a founding member of Kianda School, Nairobi, Kenya, which started as Kianda Secretarial College. It was the first multi-racial girls' school in East Africa.

She is a member of the Strathmore University University Council.

She was born in New York City on November 12, 1934 and studied modern languages at Trinity College Dublin, from which she received her MA degree in 1956. She also holds a H.Dip.Ed. from University College Dublin (1957).

The second edition of her book To Africa with a Dream, which describes her 50 years of work in Kenya and other African countries, was published in 2011 by Boissevain Books.

In June 2011 she received a Litt.D. degree, honoris causa, from Strathmore University, the first woman to receive an honorary doctorate from the University.

Works

External links
Kianda School
Kianda Foundation
Strathmore University
Boissevain Books

Kenyan women writers
Living people
1934 births